The Changbaishan railway station is a station on the Dunhua–Baihe high-speed railway. It opened on 24 December 2021 and serves Erdaobaihe town and the Changbai Mountain Scenic Area. The station is located in a scenic forested area.

References 

Railway stations in Jilin
Railway stations in China opened in 2021